The Order of the Banner of Labor was a governmental award in Poland during the 20th-century era of the Polish People's Republic, a former Marxist-Leninist state.

The order was established by the Sejm (a chamber of the Polish parliament) on 2 July 1949. It was given in recognition of "unique achievements for the Nation and the Country". In 1960 the criteria for receiving this award were changed to "special achievements for building socialism in the Polish People's Republic".

The Order was also awarded to institutions and was automatically awarded to miners after 20 years of dedicated labor.

See also
Order of the Builders of People's Poland
Order of the Red Banner

References

1949 establishments in Poland
1992 disestablishments in Poland
Awards established in 1949
Awards disestablished in 1992
Polish People's Republic
Civil awards and decorations of Poland